The 1982 NCAA Division I men's ice hockey tournament was the culmination of the 1981–82 NCAA Division I men's ice hockey season, the 35th such tournament in NCAA history. It was held between March 19 and 27, 1982, and concluded with North Dakota defeating Wisconsin 5-2. All Quarterfinals matchups were held at home team venues while all succeeding games were played at the Providence Civic Center in Providence, Rhode Island.

Qualifying teams
The NCAA permitted 8 teams to qualify for the tournament and divided its qualifiers into two regions (East and West). Each of the tournament champions from the three Division I conferences (CCHA, ECAC and WCHA) received automatic invitations into the tournament. Two additional automatic bids were received by the two ECAC division champions that did not contain the ECAC champion. At-large bids made up the remaining 3 teams, an additional 1 eastern and 2 western schools.

Format
The tournament featured three rounds of play. The two odd-number ranked teams from one region were placed into a bracket with the two even-number ranked teams of the other region. The teams were then seeded according to their ranking. In the Quarterfinals the first and fourth seeds and the second and third seeds played two-game aggregate series to determine which school advanced to the Semifinals. Beginning with the Semifinals all games were played at the Providence Civic Center and all series became Single-game eliminations. The winning teams in the semifinals advanced to the National Championship Game with the losers playing in a Third Place game.

Tournament bracket

Note: * denotes overtime period(s)

Quarterfinals

(E1) Northeastern vs. (W4) Bowling Green

(E2) New Hampshire vs. (W3) Michigan State

(W1) Wisconsin vs. (E4) Harvard

(W2) North Dakota vs. (E3) Clarkson

Semifinal

(E1) Northeastern vs. (W2) North Dakota

(W1) Wisconsin vs. (E2) New Hampshire

Third-place game

(E1) Northeastern vs. (E2) New Hampshire

National Championship

(W1) Wisconsin vs. (W2) North Dakota

All-Tournament team
G: Darren Jensen (North Dakota)
D: Bruce Driver (Wisconsin)
D: James Patrick (North Dakota)
F: Cary Eades (North Dakota)
F: John Newbery (Wisconsin)
F: Phil Sykes* (North Dakota)
* Most Outstanding Player(s)

References

Tournament
NCAA Division I men's ice hockey tournament
NCAA Division I Men's Ice Hockey Tournament
NCAA Division I Men's Ice Hockey Tournament
NCAA Division I Men's Ice Hockey Tournament
NCAA Division I Men's Ice Hockey Tournament
NCAA Division I Men's Ice Hockey Tournament
NCAA Division I Men's Ice Hockey Tournament
NCAA Division I Men's Ice Hockey Tournament
History of Madison, Wisconsin
Ice hockey competitions in Providence, Rhode Island
Ice hockey competitions in Boston
Ice hockey competitions in New Hampshire
Ice hockey competitions in North Dakota
Ice hockey competitions in Wisconsin
Sports in Madison, Wisconsin
Sports in Grand Forks, North Dakota
Durham, New Hampshire